Mount Hosmer may refer to:
Mount Hosmer (British Columbia)
Mount Hosmer (Iowa)